Sir John Warburton Paul  (29 March 1916 – 31 March 2004) was a British colonial administrator and civil servant, who most notably served as the final Governor of the Gambia (1962–1965) and Governor of the Bahamas (1972–1973) prior to both of those countries achieving independence from the United Kingdom. Paul also served as the first Governor-General of the Gambia from 1965 to 1966, the Governor of British Honduras from 1966 to 1972, the first Governor-General of the Bahamas in 1973, and the Lieutenant Governor of the Isle of Man from 1974 to 1980.

Early life and education 
Paul was born in Weymouth, Dorset, and attended Weymouth College. He went on to study at Selwyn College, Cambridge.

Military service 
He was commissioned into the Royal Tank Corps Supplementary Reserve in 1937 and into the regular Royal Tank Regiment in 1938. He won a Military Cross for his bravery during the German invasion of France in 1940. However, he was captured by the Germans in 1940 and was a prisoner of war until the end of the war in 1945. He was promoted Lieutenant in 1941 and Captain in 1946 and resigned his commission in 1947.

Colonial career 
Following the war, Paul entered colonial administration, serving in various position in Sierra Leone until its independence in 1961. He was knighted in 1962, becoming the Governor of the Gambia. He served until that country's independence in February 1965, and became its first Governor-General. In 1966, he was replaced in this role by a Gambian doctor. He then went on to become Governor of British Honduras, from 1966 to 1972. He dealt with demonstrations which were sparked by rumours that the territory was to be annexed by Guatemala.

Paul then went on to become the last Governor of the Bahamas, serving from 1972 to 1973. He continued to serve as acting Governor-General for a period in 1973 following independence. His last role in the colonial service was a Lieutenant Governor of the Isle of Man, which he held from 1974 to 1980. Following that he retired from colonial administration.

Personal life 
Paul married (Kathleen) Audrey Weeden in 1946. They had three daughters and were married for 58 years, until he died in March 2004. Audrey died in December 2004.

References 

|-
 

British Militia officers
Colonial Administrative Service officers
British Army personnel of World War II
1916 births
2004 deaths
British governors of the Bahamas
Governors of the Gambia
Governors-General of the Gambia
Governors of British Honduras
Lieutenant Governors of the Isle of Man
Alumni of Selwyn College, Cambridge
Recipients of the Military Cross
Royal Tank Regiment officers
British World War II prisoners of war
World War II prisoners of war held by Germany
Knights Grand Cross of the Order of St Michael and St George
Officers of the Order of the British Empire
People from Weymouth, Dorset
20th-century Bahamian people
20th-century British politicians